Online shaming is a form of public shaming in which targets are publicly humiliated on the internet, via social media platforms (e.g. Twitter or Facebook), or more localized media (e.g. email groups). As online shaming frequently involves exposing private information on the Internet, the ethics of public humiliation has been a source of debate over internet privacy and media ethics. Online shaming takes many forms, including call-outs, cancellation (cancel culture), doxing, negative reviews, and revenge porn.

Description 
Online shaming is a form of public shaming in which internet users are harassed, mocked, or bullied by other internet users online. This shaming may involve commenting directly to or about the shamed; the sharing of private messages; or the posting of private photos. Those being shamed are perceived to have committed a social transgression, and other internet users then use public exposure to shame the offender.

People have been shamed online for a variety of reasons, usually consisting of some form of social transgression such as posting offensive comments, posting offensive images or memes, online gossip, or lying. Those who are shamed online have not necessarily committed any social transgression, however. Online shaming may be used to get revenge (for example, in the form of revenge pornography), stalk, blackmail, or to threaten other internet users.

Privacy violation is a major issue in online shaming. Those being shamed may be denied the right to privacy and be subject to defamation. David Furlow, chairman of the Media, Privacy and Defamation Committee of the American Bar Association, has identified the potential privacy concerns raised by websites facilitating the distribution of information that is not part of the public record (documents filed with a government agency) and has said that such websites "just [give] a forum to people whose statements may not reflect truth."

Types

Call-outs and cancellation 

Cancel culture or call-out culture describes a form of ostracism in which someone or something is thrust out of social or professional circles, either online on social media, in the real world, or both. They are said to be "canceled". Merriam-Webster defines cancel as "to stop giving support to that person", and dictionary.com defines it as "calling out the bad behavior, boycotting their work (such as by not watching their movies or listening to their music), and trying to take away their public platform and power". Lisa Nakamura, professor of media studies at the University of Michigan, defines cancelling as simply a "cultural boycott" in which the act of depriving someone of attention deprives them of their livelihood.

The notion of cancel culture is a variant on the term "call-out culture", and constitutes a form of boycott involving an individual (usually a celebrity) who is deemed to have acted or spoken in a questionable or controversial manner.

Over the past few years, cancel culture has become a pervasive presence in American society. Most Americans find the term more associated with social media and entertainment instead of politics. Business Insider conducted a poll in conjunction with SurveyMonkey that asked 1,129 respondents "When you hear the term 'cancel culture,' which of the following do you most associate it with? Please select all that apply." 48% of respondents identified cancel culture with social media, 34% identified cancel culture with the entertainment industry, 31% associated it with the news media, 20% listed colleges, and 16% did not know what cancel culture was. Regarding politics, partisan splits on this issue were widespread; for instance, almost half of Republicans associated cancel culture with Democrats.

Doxing 

Doxing involves researching and broadcasting personally identifiable information about an individual, often with the intention of harming that person. This information may include the person's home address, workplace or school, full name, spouses, credit card information, and phone number.

Bruce Schneier, a lecturer and fellow at Harvard Kennedy School, has elaborated that doxing does not just happen to individuals. Companies such as Sony and Ashley Madison have been involved previously in doxing schemes.

Negative reviews
User generated review sites such as Yelp, Google Maps and Trip Advisor have been used to publicly shame or punish businesses.

Revenge porn 

Non-consensual sharing of sexually explicit material in order to humiliate a person, frequently distributed by computer hackers or ex-partners. Images and video of sexual acts are often combined with doxing of a person's private details, such as their home addresses and workplaces. In some jurisdictions, revenge porn is a criminal offense.

Social status shaming 
Social status shaming is a form of online shaming that involves bullying others online due to their socioeconomic status. This phenomenon is centered around using someone's income, social status, health, and influence to subject them certain types of bullying and online criticism. It is often utilized as a vessel for social control among classes, and has been regarded as one of the most effective models in which to examine social status and its influence on controlling those below oneself. In the digital world we live in, there is a social standard that people fall into and try to mimic. Thus, social status shaming is a form of social exclusion, where if someone isn't as rich as another, then that person will be subjected to some form of bullying and criticism in order for them to retain social control over the poorer person.

Notable examples

Ashley Madison data breach

In July 2015, a group hacked the user data of Ashley Madison, a commercial dating website marketed as helping people have extramarital affairs. In August 2015, over 30 million user account details; including names and email addresses were released publicly.

A variety of security researchers and Internet privacy activists debated the ethics of the release.

Clinical psychologists argued that dealing with an affair in a particularly public way increases the hurt for spouses and children. Carolyn Gregoire argued "[s]ocial media has created an aggressive culture of public shaming in which individuals take it upon themselves to inflict psychological damage" and more often than not, "the punishment goes beyond the scope of the crime." Charles J. Orlando, who had joined the site to conduct research concerning women who cheat, said he felt users of the site were anxious the release of sexually explicit messages would humiliate their spouses and children. He wrote it is alarming "the mob that is the Internet is more than willing to serve as judge, jury, and executioner" and members of the site "don't deserve a flogging in the virtual town square with millions of onlookers."

Tim Hunt controversy 
In 2015, the Nobel laureate Sir Tim Hunt was involved in a highly publicized controversy at the World Conference of Science Journalists (WCSJ) in Seoul. At a lunch for female journalists and scientists, Hunt gave a speech at short notice which was later recounted by an unnamed EU official:

In the audience were science journalists Connie St Louis, Deborah Blum and Ivan Oransky, who found Hunt's remarks highly inappropriate. They decided to publicize his remarks on Twitter, giving St Louis the task of writing a short text to be tweeted and corroborated by the other two. The tweet cast the remarks in starkly sexist terms, declared that Hunt had "utterly ruined" the luncheon, and gave no indication that he had been joking.

St Louis's tweet went viral, setting off what The Observer described as a "particularly vicious social media campaign." The Royal Society quickly distanced itself from Hunt's comments as reported and emphasized its commitment to equality in the sciences. To ridicule the "sexist scientist", the online feminist magazine Vagenda urged female scientists to post mundane pictures of themselves at work under the hashtag "#distractinglysexy".

Two days after the speech, Hunt gave a BBC radio interview saying "I did mean the part about having trouble with girls. It is true that I have fallen in love with people in the lab, and that people in the lab have fallen in love with me, and it's very disruptive to the science. It's terribly important that, in the lab, people are on a level playing field. And I found these emotional entanglements made life very difficult. I mean, I'm really, really sorry that I caused any offence – that's awful. I certainly didn't mean – I just meant to be honest, actually." Hunt went on to say "I'm very sorry if people took offense. I certainly did not mean to demean women, but rather be honest about my own shortcomings."

Numerous media outlets reported on the incident and the interview, citing portions of Hunt's original remarks and criticizing them as sexist. The editors of Nature called on "all involved in science [to] condemn the comments", which they took as a seriously intended suggestion "that single-sex labs might be preferable". Hunt felt he had made it clear he was joking because he had included the phrase "now seriously" in his statement. The reconstruction of his words by an unnamed EU official corroborated the inclusion of these words.

Resignations
On June 10 Hunt resigned from his position as an honorary professor with the University College London's Faculty of Life Sciences and from the Royal Society's Biological Sciences Awards Committee. Hunt's wife, immunologist Mary Collins, had been told by a senior [at UCL] that Hunt "had to resign immediately or be sacked". He was consequently required to step down from the science committee of the European Research Council.

Jonathan Dimbleby resigned from an honorary fellowship at UCL in protest at its treatment of Hunt. Also, author and journalist Jeremy Hornsby wrote University College London out of his will in protest, leaving it "about £100,000 worse off".

Wider reaction
At least 8 Nobel prizewinning scientists and 21 honorary fellows had criticized the treatment of Hunt following his resignation. Boris Johnson, the mayor of London, and Richard Dawkins, an evolutionary biologist expressed similar indignation. A few scientists, such as Hunt's co-Nobelist, Paul Nurse, were critical of Hunt's conduct and said that his resignation was warranted.

Imran Khan, Chief Executive of the British Science Association, speaking to the BBC, described Hunt's comments as "careless", adding that it is "hard to find Sir Tim's comments funny if you've been held back by systemic bias for years – whether those remarks were intended as a joke or not".

In a letter to The Times a group of 29 staff scientists, students and postdoctoral fellows, both male and female, who had worked with Hunt, wrote in support of his character. They described how his help had been "instrumental in the advancement of many other women and men in science beyond those in his own lab" and how he had "actively encouraged an interest in science in schoolchildren and young scientists, arranging for work experience and summer students of both genders to get their first taste of research in his lab". They urged the ERC and UCL to "reconsider their rush to judgment".

Hunt had been scheduled to appear later in June at the 2015 Lindau Meeting but it was decided that his presence would be a distraction for the rest of the panel. His case was discussed, however, at a panel on science communication as a possible example of "communications overkill".

Paul Nurse, head of the Royal Society, who shared the 2001 Nobel prize in medicine with Hunt, while stressing his esteem for Hunt as a person, originally stated that Hunt had said "some stupid things which cannot be supported and they had to be condemned" and that the affair had been bad for science and for the Royal Society in particular, adding that the discussion had "become totally polarized with extreme views on both sides". In a later statement, Nurse described the response to Hunt's comments as "a twitter and media storm, completely out of proportion", adding that "he should never have been sacked by University College London".

For his part, Hunt has distanced himself from the controversy, commenting that he had been "turned into a straw man that one lot loves to love and the other lot loves to hate and then they just take up sides and hurled utterly vile abuse at everyone".

"Shirtstorm" controversy 
In November 2014, while giving a televised status update on the Rosetta space craft, Matt Taylor wore a shirt depicting scantily-clad cartoon women with firearms made by his friend, a female artist. Taylor's decision to wear the shirt to a press conference drew criticism from a number of commentators, who saw a reflection of a culture where women are unwelcome in scientific fields (see gender inequality). Others, including Boris Johnson, Julie Bindel and Tim Stanley, made arguments against this criticism. The woman who made the shirt for Taylor as a birthday present stated that she "did not expect" the shirt to attract the level of attention that it did. Taylor later made a public apology, saying: "The shirt I wore this week – I made a big mistake, and I offended many people. And I'm very sorry about this". Some writers expressed appreciation for Taylor's apology. A campaign was set up on the crowdfund website Indiegogo, with the objective of raising $3,000 to buy Taylor a gift, as a token of the public's appreciation for the work that he and the team had done. The campaign raised a total of $24,003, of which $23,000 was donated to UNAWE at Taylor's request, the remainder going towards a plaque commemorating the mission.

Hypatia transracialism controversy 

The feminist philosophy journal Hypatia became involved in a dispute in April 2017 that led to the online shaming of one of its authors. The journal published an article about transracialism by Rebecca Tuvel, an assistant professor of philosophy, comparing the situation of Caitlyn Jenner, a trans woman, to that of Rachel Dolezal, a white woman who identifies as black. The article was criticized on Facebook and Twitter as a source of "epistemic violence", and the author became the subject of personal attacks. Academics associated with Hypatia joined in the criticism. A member of the journal's editorial board became the point of contact for an open letter demanding that the article be retracted, and the journal's board of associate editors issued an unauthorized apology, saying the article should never have been published. Rogers Brubaker described the episode in the New York Times as an example of "internet shaming".

Goblin Valley rock-toppling incident 

In October 2013, a delicately balanced hoodoo in Goblin Valley State Park was intentionally knocked over by Boy Scout leaders who had been camping in the area. David Benjamin Hall captured video and shouted encouragement while Glenn Tuck Taylor toppled the formation. They posted the video to Facebook, whereupon it was viewed by thousands and the two men began receiving death threats. Their claim that the hoodoo appeared unstable, and that they vandalized it out of concern for passersby, was rejected by Fred Hayes, director of the Utah Division of State Parks and Recreation. Hall and Taylor were expelled from Boy Scouts and charged with third-degree felonies, ultimately pleading guilty to lesser charges of misdemeanor criminal mischief.

Dog Poop Girl 

In 2005 in South Korea, bloggers targeted a woman who refused to clean up when her dog defecated on the floor of a Seoul subway car, labeling her "Dog Poop Girl" (rough translation of  into English). Another commuter had taken a photograph of the woman and her dog, and posted it on a popular South Korean website. Within days, she had been identified by Internet vigilantes, and much of her personal information was leaked onto the Internet in an attempt to punish her for the offense. The story received mainstream attention when it was widely reported in South Korean media. The public humiliation led the woman to drop out of her university, according to reports.

The reaction by the South Korean public to the incident prompted several newspapers in South Korea to run editorials voicing concern over Internet vigilantism. One paper quoted Daniel Solove as saying that the woman was the victim of a "cyber-posse, tracking down norm violators and branding them with digital Scarlet Letters." Another called it an "Internet witch-hunt," and went on to say that "the Internet is turning the whole society into a kangaroo court."

Cooks Source incident 

The food magazine Cooks Source printed an article by Monica Gaudio without her permission in their October 2010 issue. Learning of the copyright violation, Gaudio emailed Judith Griggs, managing editor of Cooks Source Magazine, requesting that the magazine both apologize and also donate $130 to the Columbia School of Journalism as payment for using her work. Instead she received a very unapologetic letter stating that she (Griggs) herself should be thanked for making the piece better and that Gaudio should be glad that she didn't give someone else credit for writing the article. During the ensuing public outcry, online vigilantes took it upon themselves to avenge Gaudio. The Cooks Source Facebook page was flooded with thousands of contemptuous comments, forcing the magazine's staff to create new pages in an attempt to escape the protest and accuse 'hackers' of taking control of the original page. The magazine's website was stripped of all content by the staff and shut down a week later.

Donglegate 
Donglegate was a 2014 incident in which a woman posted a photograph of two men who were sitting behind her at an almost-all-male conference making sexual double-entendres.

See also 

 Abusive power and control
 Anti-social behaviour
 Anti-fan
 Cancel culture
 Character assassination
 Culture of fear
 Cyberbullying
 Deplatforming
 Double standard
 Escrache
 Ghosting
 Internet troll
 Internet vigilantism
 Ostracism
 Peer pressure
 Review bomb
 Shame campaign
 Shunning
 Smear campaign
 So You've Been Publicly Shamed
 Struggle session
 Twitter

References

External links
 Hate Crimes in Cyberspace – by Danielle Keats Citron
 The Outrage Machine: a short documentary by Retro Report that looks at the origin of Internet shaming and what it feels like to be caught up in a case of online shaming gone viral.
 Cyberbullying Reports: an online community dedicated to exposing cyberbullying.

Internet vigilantism
Internet privacy
Cyberbullying
Cyberspace
Internet-based activism
Internet trolling
Politics and technology
Internet culture
Information society